Kothari Kanya Shala is a secondary school in Nashik, Maharashtra, India.
 It is affiliated with the Central Board of Secondary Education. The language of instruction is Marathi.

References

Schools in Nashik